Maha Bandula Road (formerly Dalhousie Road) is a major road of southern Yangon, Burma. It is named in honored of The great King Maha Bandula . It crosses the city in a west–east direction and runs parallel to Bogyoke Aung San Road. It runs past Maha Bandula Park and eventually to Maha Bandula Bridge.

Streets in Yangon